The 2014–15 season of the Bremen-Liga, the highest association football league in the German state of Bremen, was the seventh season of the league at tier five (V) of the German football league system.

League table										
The 2014–15 season saw two new clubs in the league, Leher Turnerschaft and TSV Grolland, both promoted from the Landesliga Bremen, while no club had been relegated from the Regionalliga Nord to the league.

Top goalscorers
The top goal scorers for the season:

Promotion round
The champions of the Bremen-Liga, Oberliga Hamburg and the Schleswig-Holstein-Liga as well as the runners-up from the Niedersachsenliga entered a play-off for two more spots in the Regionalliga Nord. Eight clubs from these four leagues applied for a Regionalliga licence. As the only club from Hamburg to apply for a licence, SC Victoria Hamburg, later declined participation only three clubs take part in the promotion round, Bremer SV, TSV Schilksee and VfV 06 Hildesheim, with the latter two promoted:

References

External links 
 Bremen-Liga on Fupa.net 

Bremen-Liga
Bremen